Amanda Ross is Co-Founder & CEO of Cactus TV, a production company she founded with her husband Simon Ross in 1994. Cactus specialises in broad-based entertainment, features and chat shows, making programs for many major UK broadcasters, including the BBC, ITV, UKTV and Channel 4. During a long and varied production career Ross has worked with a wide range of Hollywood stars and famous figures as diverse as Madonna and Bill and Hillary Clinton. Its programs include Martin & Roman's Weekend Best!, Zoe Ball on Saturday/Sunday, Modern Wheels or Classic Steals, Saturday Kitchen Live, The Specsavers National Book Awards, John Torode's Malaysian Adventure, Kitchen Garden Live with the Hairy Bikers, Weekend, A Taste of Britain, Drop Down Menu, Fern, Christmas Kitchen, Spring Kitchen, The Hairy Bikers' Food Tour of Britain, Madhur Jaffrey's Curry Nation, Richard & Judy, three Rachel Allen cookery series, The Galaxy National Book Awards, and the ITV3 Crime Thriller Season and Awards.

Ross also created and produced a number of major book-based campaigns on TV, including Richard & Judy's Book Club (and associated Summer Read), the televising of The Galaxy National Book Awards and The Crime Thriller Awards, The Specsavers TV Book Club, and in 2018 The Zoe Ball Book Club. She oversees all of Cactus’ book and writing initiatives, and in 2007 her book choices accounted for over 26% of all books sold in the UK.

Awards

She was named No 1 in the Observer Newspaper List of the fifty most powerful people in publishing. She won a British Book Trade Award for inspiring wider reading in 2006, and The Bookseller Award for expanding the market in 2006 and 2007, and an Outstanding Achievement Award in 2009. She received an RTS Educational Television Award in 2007 for her role in the Channel 4 ‘Lost for Words Season’ which focused on children's literacy. She was voted in the top five of London's ‘Literary Life’ in the Evening Standard's ‘1000 Most Influential People 2008’.

She has a BA (Hons) in Drama from Birmingham University. She is also a Trustee of the Children's Charity, Kidscape and on the UK Advisory Board for the charity Room to Read, an Ambassador for Wellbeing of Women, and also for the National Literacy Trust.

References

British television executives
Women television executives
Living people
Alumni of the University of Birmingham
Year of birth missing (living people)